The Painted Bird is a 2019 internationally co-produced black and white war drama film written, directed and produced by Václav Marhoul. An adaptation of Jerzy Kosiński's novel of the same name, it is the first film to feature the Interslavic language; Marhoul stated that he decided to use Interslavic so that no Slavic nation would nationally identify with the story.

The Painted Bird was selected to play in competition at the 76th Venice International Film Festival and was chosen for 2019 Toronto International Film Festival as part of Special Presentations. The film also screened in the Dare strand at the 63rd BFI London Film Festival. It was selected as the Czech entry for the Best International Feature Film at the 92nd Academy Awards making the December shortlist. Its brutal scenes led to walkouts from audiences at the Venice, Toronto and London film festivals. At the 35th Warsaw International Film Festival, the audience honored the film with a long ovation after its only screening.

Plot
In an unidentified area of war-torn Eastern Europe, a young boy lives with his elderly aunt. Startled at her death, the boy accidentally sets the house ablaze and leaves. His further adventures are a series of horrific encounters with ignorance, exploitation, and depravity. In the first village he reaches, an old healer buys him, but he is later blamed for bad luck and thrown in a river. He is next taken in by a miller and his wife. After the miller gouges out the eyes of a younger man seen exchanging glances with his wife, the boy runs off. He meets Lekh, a bird breeder who treats him well. Lekh has sex with a wild woman whom local village women brutally rape, after which Lekh hangs himself. The boy leaves.

The boy finds a tame horse with a broken leg and takes it to the next village, where a villager kills it. Cossack Cavalry Corps force the villagers to deliver him to the Germans, identifying him as a Jew. The German soldier tasked with executing the boy releases him. Later caught by SS guards who bring him to a local town, he is saved from execution. A local priest takes him in, but then arranges for him to lodge with a local man named Garbos, who proves to be a pedophile. The boy causes Garbos's gruesome death. After the well-meaning priest dies, his replacement has no use for the boy, and he is run out of the town.

The boy is then taken in by Labina. When her elderly father dies, she coaxes the boy into performing sexual acts on her, beating him when he fails to perform and mocking his inadequacy by simulating sex with a goat. He later retaliates by killing the goat and tossing its head through Labina's window before running away.

The boy comes into contact with the Red Army again. One of the Soviet officers, a sniper named Mitka, decides to take care of him temporarily. The boy watches Mitka kill several locals in reprisal for an attack on Russian soldiers. As the Russians decamp, they send the boy to an orphanage, where he is a loner and repeatedly tries to escape. He is beaten by a local anti-Semitic shopkeeper, whom he kills in revenge. A man named Nikodém comes to the orphanage, greets the boy tearfully as his son, and takes him home. The boy refuses to speak. Nikodém tries to explain why they sent him to his aunt and the boy protests angrily. He asks if he at least remembers his name, but the boy does not respond. Traveling by bus toward home, Nikodém falls asleep. His son notices a number tattooed on his father's arm and with his finger writes his name, Joska, on the bus window.

Cast

Production
Václav Marhoul announced his intention to adapt Jerzy Kosiński's The Painted Bird in September 2012 when he secured rights for the story. Marhoul stated that the film will have budget approximately 120 million CZK. His plan was to secure finances during next 2 years. The film received financial support of 15 million CZK from the Czech Film Fund in 2016.

The film entered production in 2017. Marhoul decided to shoot the film in seven phases. First phase finished on 7 May 2017. Filmmakers were filming around Ukrainian village Svalovych from 23 March 2017 to 12 April 2017. Some reshoots had to be made from 21 to 23 April 2017 in Brdy Military area. Second phase started in South Slovakia on 5 June 2017 to 5 July 2017. Film crew was shooting around Váh river, at Mlynská Dolina and in Malý Dunajec.

Shooting moved to Lipno Dam and Kvilda in February and March 2018. Crew had to deal with bad weather as they needed ice on the lake. Shooting concluded in July 2018 after 100 shooting days during 16 months. The film then entered post production. Post production concluded in February 2019.

For the villagers' dialogue, Marhoul decided to use the Interslavic language instead of any ethnic Slavic language:

Release

Theatrical
The first trailer for the film was released on 28 July 2019. The film had its worldwide premiere at 76th Venice International Film Festival on 3 September 2019. The film was first projected in Czech cinemas for journalists on 11 September 2019. It entered distribution for Czech cinemas on 12 September 2019. The film was originally scheduled to be released in May 2019.

IFC Films became the distributor of the film for United States in October 2019. Premiere in the United States was set for 10 July 2020.

Premiere in the United Kingdom was set for 27 March 2020.

Home media
The film is set to be released on Home Media in the Czech Republic and Slovakia on 25 March 2020.

Reception

Critical response
The Painted Bird has received very positive reviews from critics with many likening it to films by Andrei Tarkovsky. The site's critics consensus reads: "Brutally uncompromising in its portrayal of Nazi Germany, The Painted Bird is a difficult watch that justifies its dark horror with searing impact." On Metacritic, the film has a weighted average score of 72 out of 100, based on 23 critics, indicating "generally favorable reviews".

The film was projected for journalists on 2 September 2019. Some people left the theatre as they could not stand the depicted violence and rape scenes. The Daily Mail described it as "a panoply of depravity.” Overall reception was positive as the film received a long ovation from the audience and some unofficial responses called it one of the front-runners for Golden Lion, but ultimately lost to Joker. Director Marhoul was particularly praised. The film also received a 10-minute standing ovation during its premiere on 3 September 2019.

Xan Brooks of The Guardian gave the film five stars, calling it a "savage, searing three-hour tour of hell" and "phantasmagorical horror, rattling around ravaged eastern Europe for just shy of three hours." He praised the film's visuals and atmosphere. Guy Lodge of Variety was also positive, noting camerawork by Vladimír Smutný. He called the film "muscular, savagely realized Jerzy Kosiński adaptation puts an unnamed Jewish boy through a challenging litany of Holocaust horrors."

In a more negative review, A.A. Dowd of The A.V. Club praised the film's cinematography while criticizing its bleak tone, saying "The Painted Bird is, in the end, the kind of slog that treats shopworn insights about the brutality of man as justification for drowning us in the evidence."

The Hollywood Reporter picked The Painted Bird as one of 20 best films projected at Film festivals during Fall 2019.

Box office
The film opened in Czech cinemas on 12 September 2019. It was attended by 26,094 people and grossed 4,034,060 CZK during the first weekend. The film grossed 14,267,334 CZK in Czech theatres, equal to $620,319.

Accolades
The Painted Bird was nominated for 11 Czech Lion Awards and has won 9 of them including the Best film.

International festivals
The film was selected to appear on various International film festivals. It includes:
 Venice International Film Festival
 Toronto International Film Festival
 Saint Petersburg International Film Festival
 BFI London Film Festival
 Kolkata International Film Festival
 Warsaw International Film Festival
 Chicago International Film Festival
 Vancouver International Film Festival
 Tokyo International Film Festival
Camerimage
Cairo International Film Festival
International Film Festival of India
Helsinki International Film Festival
Berlin International Film Festival
AFI European Union Film Showcase
Palm Springs International Film Festival
São Paulo International Film Festival

See also
 List of submissions to the 92nd Academy Awards for Best International Feature Film
 List of Czech submissions for the Academy Award for Best International Feature Film
 List of most expensive Czech films

References

External links
 Official website
 

2019 films
Fictional-language films
Czech black-and-white films
Czech war drama films
Ukrainian war drama films
Ukrainian black-and-white films
Films set in Europe
Incest in film
Films about rape
Films about child sexual abuse
Zoophilia in culture
2019 war drama films
Films based on Polish novels
Holocaust films
Czech Film Critics' Awards winners
Czech Lion Awards winners (films)
2019 drama films
Constructed-language media
Czech World War II films
Slovak World War II films
Ukrainian World War II films
Slovak war drama films